South Hill may refer to:

United States

 South Hill (Eureka County, Nevada), a summit
 South Hill, New York, a census-designated place in Tompkins County
 South Hill (New York), a mountain chain in Delaware and Otsego Counties
 South Hill (Oneida County, New York), a summit
 South Hill (Sullivan County, New York), a mountain
 South Hill, Minot, North Dakota, a neighborhood
 South Hill, Virginia, a town in Mecklenburg County
 South Hill, Washington, a census-designated place in Pierce County
 South Hill, a neighborhood of Spokane, Washington

Other countries

 South Hill, Anguilla, a district
 South Hill, Jersey, a hill on the island of Jersey
 South Hill, Toronto, Ontario, Canada, a neighborhood
 Söderkulla (literally "South Hill"), Finland, a village in the Sipoo municipality
 South Hill, Cornwall, UK, a civil parish and hamlet

See also
 Southill (disambiguation)